Matthew John Hanson (14 October 1909 – 7 November 1989) was an Australian rules footballer who played with Footscray in the Victorian Football League (VFL).

Notes

External links 

1909 births
1989 deaths
Australian rules footballers from New South Wales
Western Bulldogs players
South Broken Hill Football Club players